The year 1975 was the 4th year after the independence of Bangladesh. It was also the last year of the first post-independence government in Bangladesh and a year marked with a coups and coup d'état.

Incumbents

 President:
 until 25 January: Mohammad Mohammadullah
 25 January-15 August: Sheikh Mujibur Rahman
 starting 6 November: Abu Sadat Mohammad Sayem
 Prime Minister:
 until 25 January: Sheikh Mujibur Rahman
 25 January-15 August: Muhammad Mansur Ali
 starting 15 August: Post abolished
 Chief Justice: Abu Sadat Mohammad Sayem (until November 5), Syed A. B. Mahmud Hossain (starting November 18)

Demography

Climate

Economy

Note: For the year 1975 average official exchange rate for BDT was 12.19 per US$.

Events
 25 January: The fourth amendment of constitution abolishes parliamentary system and establishes presidential system.
 25 February: Establishment of Bangladesh Krishak Sramik Awami League (BAKSAL) led by Mujib as the single legitimate political party.
 15 August - Sheikh Mujibur Rahman is assassinated.
 16 October - Rahima Banu's smallpox infection is reported. She is the last known person to have been infected with naturally occurring Variola major.
 3 November: Jail Killing Day, assassination of four leaders of liberation war in prison.
 7 November: After a successful coup d'état Major Gen. Ziaur Rahman proclaims himself deputy martial law administrator with Chief Justice Sayem as Chief Martial Law Administrator.
 24 November: Col. Abu Taher arrested.

Sports
 Domestic football: Mohammedan SC won Dhaka League title, while Team JIC came out runners-up.

Births
 Ziaur Rahman Zia, musician
 Shafiq Tuhin, lyricist
 Abdul Aziz, filmmaker
 Sabrina Sultana, shooter
 Nazma Akter, labour leader
 Tazin Ahmed, actor

Deaths
 2 January - Siraj Sikder, revolutionary politician (b. 1944)
 6 April - M A Rab, Chief of Staff of army (b. 1919)
 6 April - Nurunnessa Khatun Vidyavinodini, novelist (b. 1894)
 15 August - Sheikh Mujibur Rahman, politician (b. 1920) and his family
 18 August - Shawkat Ali, politician (b. 1918)
 3 November - Tajuddin Ahmed, Syed Nazrul Islam, A. H. M. Qamaruzzaman and Muhammad Mansur Ali
 7 November - Brigadier General Khaled Mosharraf, Bir Protik (b. 1937)
 7 November - A T M Haider, Bir Uttom (b. 1942)
 26 November - Abul Hasan, poet (b. 1947)

See also 
 1970s in Bangladesh
 List of Bangladeshi films of 1975
 Timeline of Bangladeshi history

References